Aurora is a Russian airline headquartered in Yuzhno-Sakhalinsk, Sakhalin Oblast. It is a subsidiary of Aeroflot which operates domestic and international flights in the Russian Far East region. , Aurora ranks among the top ten Russian biggest airlines in terms of carried passengers.

History
Aurora was created by government order of Russian Prime Minister Dmitry Medvedev. Aurora was named Taiga Airline for a short period of time before being named after the historic Russian cruiser Aurora. Aeroflot formed the carrier by amalgamating SAT Airlines and Vladivostok Avia, which served 42 and 15 destinations respectively, and had a combined fleet of 24 aircraft plus 11 helicopters. These two carriers were expected to cease operations in early 2014. The number of routes served was planned to grow from 30 to 128, including the main cities of the Russian Far East, such as Khabarovsk, Magadan, Vladivostok and Yuzhno-Sakhalinsk. 

The carrier's first aircraft was an Airbus A319, wearing a new livery. In , the airline received the first of three Bombardier Q400 aircraft it had on order. 

Aurora is 51%-owned by Aeroflot, with the regional government of Sakhalin Oblast holding the balance. An initial investment of RUB 430 million (USD 13.5 million) was provided by the parent company through a loan that should be repaid in 2017. The airline carried 1,125 million passengers in 2015, a 7.1% increase year-on-year (YOY). During the first half of 2016 Aurora carried 607,040 passengers, a 19.9% increase YOY.

Aurora is currently being merged with five Russian regional airlines (Khabarovsk Airlines, Chukotavai, Kamchatka Air Enterprise, Yakutia Airlines, Polar Airlines) to create a single far-eastern airline for Russia. The working name of the consolidated airline is Aurora Regional.

Key people
, Konstantin Sukhorebrik holds the airline's CEO position.

Destinations

Aurora started operations on  serving the Khabarovsk–Krasnoyarsk route. , Aurora flies internationally from its three bases located in Khabarovsk, Yuzhno-Sakhalinsk and Vladivostok. The international network includes Beijing, Busan, Harbin, Hong Kong, Sapporo, Seoul, and Tokyo.

Codeshare agreements
Aurora has codeshare agreements with the following airlines:
Aeroflot
Khabarovsk Airlines
Korean Air
S7 Airlines
Yakutia Airlines

Fleet

Current

, the Aurora fleet comprises the following aircraft:

Historic
Aurora previously operated the following aircraft:
Boeing 737-200Adv
Boeing 737-500
Bombardier Dash 8-100

References

External links

 Aurora airlines official website  
 
 

Airlines established in 2013
Russian companies established in 2013
Airlines of Russia
Companies based in Yuzhno-Sakhalinsk
Russian brands
Government-owned companies of Russia
Aeroflot